Leuctra or Leuktra was a village of ancient Boeotia, situated on the road from Thespiae to Plataea, and in the territory of the former city. Its name only occurs in history on account of the celebrated Battle of Leuctra fought in its neighbourhood between the Spartans and Thebans in 371 BCE, by which the supremacy of Sparta was demolished. In the plain of Leuctra, was the tomb of the two daughters of Scedasus, a Leuctrian, both were violated by  Spartans, and had afterwards slain themselves; this tomb was crowned with wreaths by Epaminondas before the battle, since an oracle had predicted that the Spartans would be defeated at this spot. 

The site of Leuctra is near the modern village of Lefktra, renamed to reflect to connection with the ancient place.

References

Populated places in ancient Boeotia
Former populated places in Greece